Leilani Jones may refer to:

 Leilani Jones (actress) (born 1957), American actress/voiceover artist
 LeiLani Jones (born 1982) American beauty pageant titleholder